Dahira obliquifascia, the black-striped dahira, is a moth of the family Sphingidae. It is known from north-eastern India, Nepal, Thailand, southern China, Taiwan, Vietnam and Peninsular Malaysia.

The wingspan is about 78 mm.

References

Dahira
Moths described in 1910